Barishal Cadet College, is a  prestigious Military school in Rahmatpur, Babuganj, Barisal, Bangladesh. (location on map)

History
Before the independence of Bangladesh, the then Pakistan government established four cadet colleges by following the British public schools' model. After independence, due to the success of those schools, the Bangladesh Defense Force kept those colleges (which are high schools by American definition) and established eight more cadet colleges (three girls and five boys).

Previously, it was Barisal Residential Model College. In 1981 the Bangladesh government converted it into a cadet college. Its first principal was Mr Md. Mufazzal Husain who was also the project director during initial phase of development. As a cadet college, it has a large number of placements of its alumni in the national armed forces. In addition, it is notable for its results in the national exams at the secondary school and higher secondary level and the placements of its alumni in national universities.

Overview
Barishal Cadet College boards approximately 330 boys between the ages of 12 and 18 (roughly 54 in each year for grade-7 ) through a nationwide admission test composed of written, oral and medical examinations.

The school is headed by a Principal, appointed by the Adjutant General's Branch of Bangladesh Army. It contains three houses- Shariatullah, Shaheed Suhrawardy and Sher-e-Bangla each headed by a housemaster, selected from the senior members of the teaching staff. Like all other Cadet Colleges it also exerts importance towards the self-development and self dependency of its cadets. Cadets of this college are performing in every aspect of the development of the nation. Every year in academic side, the cadets are showing their brilliance in SSC HSC and also in further education.

Houses

See also
 List of cadet colleges in Bangladesh

Military high schools
Cadet colleges in Bangladesh
Education in Barisal
Educational Institutions affiliated with Bangladesh Army
Educational institutions established in 1981
1981 establishments in Bangladesh